"American Beauty Rose" is a 1950 song written by Hal David, Redd Evans and Arthur Altman,  which was a minor hit for Eddy Howard and for Frank Sinatra in 1950. It was also popularized by Sinatra's second version as a charting single in 1961. The song was included on his Come Swing with Me! LP, as the B-side to "Sentimental Journey".

Composer and critic Alec Wilder mentioned the song in passing in his book American Popular Song: The Great Innovators, 1900–1950, noting that "Sinatra could make every song but 'Jealous Lover' and 'American Beauty Rose' sound reputable."

References

1950 songs
Frank Sinatra songs
Songs with lyrics by Hal David
Songs with lyrics by Redd Evans
Songs with music by Arthur Altman